Libor Gerčák (born 22 July 1975), is a Czech futsal player who plays for 1.FC Nejzbach Vysoké Mýto and the Czech Republic national futsal team.

References

External links
UEFA profile

1975 births
Living people
Futsal goalkeepers
Czech men's futsal players